Solo of Fortune is a 1989 role-playing game supplement published by R. Talsorian Games for Cyberpunk.

Contents
Solo of Fortune is the first in a series of Cyberpunk supplements, with each book focusing on a different character class.

Reception
Solo of Fortune was reviewed in Space Gamer Vol. II No. 2. The reviewer commented that "If your campaign uses Solos or vehicles to any extent, it'll be worth your while."

References

Cyberpunk (role-playing game) supplements
Role-playing game supplements introduced in 1989